OGX or .ogx may refer to:
 Dommo Energia, formerly OGX, a Brazilian oil and natural gas company that is controlled by the conglomerate EBX Group
 .ogx, an audio/video file format, see Ogg
 OGX-011, or custirsen sodium, an anti-cancer drug
 Ain Beida Airport, in Ouargla, Algeria, the IATA code
 OGX Beauty, a hair product company
 Ogden Express, an upcoming Bus Rapid Transit line in Ogden, Utah.